Pittsburgh Institute of Mortuary Science is a funeral service program based in the Shadyside neighborhood of Pittsburgh, Pennsylvania, United States.

Notable alumni
 James Huberty – Perpetrator of the San Ysidro McDonald's massacre.
 John J. Hafer – Maryland state senator

References

External links
 

Education in Pittsburgh
Mortuary schools